Chinese loach may refer to any of several loaches and hillstream loaches, including:

 Beaufortia kweichowensis
 Misgurnus anguillicaudatus
 Misgurnus mizolepis
 Sinibotia pulchra
 Paramisgurnus dabryanus